is a 2019 Japanese horror film. It is an adaptation of the manga series of the same name by Norimitsu Kaihō and Sadoru Chiba. The film was announced in an issue of Manga Time Kirara Forward in November 2017, and it was released by Universal Pictures and Regents in Japan on January 25, 2019.

The film is directed by Issei Shibata and starred the members of the idol group Last Idol. Sentai Filmworks distributed the film in the United States, Canada, United Kingdom, Ireland, Australia, New Zealand, Latin America, Nordic countries, the Netherlands, Spain and Portugal.

Premise
It tells the story of Kurumi Ebisuzawa, Yuki Takeya, Yuuri Wakasa and Miki Naoki attending the same high school in Japan, but they also know one another because they reside in the school's dormitory and having a school club. The school girls are having fun until a zombie outbreak occurs, infecting the school population. The four girls must now learn to survive in this new world, if they want to stay alive.

Cast
 Midori Nagatsuki as Yuki Takeya
 Nanami Abe as Kurumi Ebisuzawa
 Wakana Majima as Yūri Wakasa
 Rio Kiyohara as Miki Naoki
 Nonoka Ono as "Megu-nee" Megumi Sakura
 Daichi Kaneko as Tsumugi Katsuragi

Reception
Matt Schley from The Japan Times gave the film a score of 1.5 out of 5 citing: "Being aggressively boring, in fact, is the greatest sin of School-Live The principle that each scene of a film should push the story forward is discarded with abandon". The movie was praised by the authors of the original School-Live! manga series.

References

External links
 Official website 
 
 School-Live! on Rotten Tomatoes

2019 films
2019 horror films
2019 independent films
2010s monster movies
Apocalyptic films
Films set in Japan
Films set in schools
Focus Features films
2010s Japanese-language films
Japanese zombie films
Japanese independent films
Live-action films based on manga
Japanese high school films
Universal Pictures films
2010s Japanese films